JW Marriott is a luxury hotel brand owned by Marriott International.

History
The JW Marriott brand was established in 1984, with the opening of the first hotel in Washington, D.C. It was named as a tribute to J.W. Marriott, the founder of Marriott Corporation. In 1989, Hong Kong was the destination for the overseas launch. Europe and the Middle East followed in 1993. As a general guide within the Marriott hierarchy, the brand competes in luxury as below Ritz-Carlton, but above the traditional Marriott and Renaissance.

The JW Marriott Jakarta experienced terrorist bombings in 2003 and 2009. In the 2003 incident, a car bomb explosion outside the lobby killed 12 and injured 150, mainly Indonesians. Despite extensive damage, the hotel reopened five weeks later. In the 2009 incident, a bomb in a small breakfast room caused six deaths. An unexploded bomb in a guest room failed to detonate.

Accommodations

Historical

From 2015

Properties 
As of January 1, 2023, there are 100 hotels and resorts with 42,602 rooms open and operating, in addition to 40 hotels with 17,041 rooms in the pipeline, under the brand:

 
 JW Marriott Gold Coast Resort & Spa
 
 JW Marriott Absheron Baku
 
 JW Marriott Rio de Janeiro
 JW Marriott São Paulo
 
 JW Marriott Edmonton ICE District
 JW Marriott Parq Vancouver
 JW Marriott The Rosseau Muskoka Resort & Spa
 
 JW Marriott Beijing
 JW Marriott Beijing Central
 JW Marriott Changsha
 JW Marriott Chengdu
 JW Marriott Chongqing
 JW Marriott Hangzhou
 JW Marriott Harbin River North
 JW Marriott Marquis Shanghai Pudong
 JW Marriott Qufu
 JW Marriott Sanya Dadonghai Bay
 JW Marriott Sanya Haitang Bay Resort & Spa
 JW Marriott Shanghai at Tomorrow Square
 JW Marriott Shanghai Changfeng Park
 JW Marriott Shanghai Fengxian
 JW Marriott Shenzhen
 JW Marriott Shenzhen Bao'an
 JW Marriott Taiyuan
 JW Marriott Xi'an
 JW Marriott Yinchuan
 JW Marriott Zhejiang Anji
 JW Marriott Zhengzhou
 
 JW Marriott Bogota
 
 JW Marriott Guanacaste Resort & Spa
 
 JW Marriott Santo Domingo
 
 JW Marriott Quito
 
 JW Marriott Cairo
 
 JW Marriott Cannes
 
 JW Marriott Berlin
 JW Marriott Frankfurt
 JW Marriott Munich (under construction, opening 2023)
 
 JW Marriott Hong Kong
 
 JW Marriott Bengaluru
 JW Marriott Bengaluru Prestige Golfshire Resort & Spa
 JW Marriott Chandigarh
 JW Marriott Kolkata
 JW Marriott Mumbai Juhu
 JW Marriott Mumbai Sahar
 JW Marriott Mussoorie Walnut Grove Resort & Spa
 JW Marriott New Delhi Aerocity
 JW Marriott Pune
 
 JW Marriott Jakarta
 JW Marriott Medan
 JW Marriott Surabaya
 
 JW Marriott Venice Resort & Spa
 
 JW Marriott Nara
 
 JW Marriott Kuwait City
 
 JW Marriott Nairobi (under construction, opening 2022)
 
 JW Marriott Kuala Lumpur
 
 JW Marriott Maldives Resort & Spa
 
 JW Marriott Macau
 
 JW Marriott Mauritius Resort
 
 JW Marriott Cancun Resort & Spa
 JW Marriott Guadalajara
 JW Marriott Los Cabos Beach Resort & Spa
 JW Marriott Mexico City
 JW Marriott Mexico City Santa Fe
 JW Marriott Monterrey Valle
 
 JW Marriott Muscat
 
 JW Marriott Panama 
 
 JW Marriott El Convento Cusco
 JW Marriott Lima
 
 JW Marriott Marquis City Center Doha 
 
 JW Marriott Bucharest Grand Hotel
 
 JW Marriott Riyadh
 
JW Marriott Singapore South Beach
 
 JW Marriott Dongdaemun Square Seoul
 JW Marriott Seoul
 
 JW Marriott Madrid (opening February 2023)
 
 JW Marriott Ankara
 JW Marriott Istanbul Bosphorus
 JW Marriott Istanbul Marmara Sea 
 
 JW Marriott Bangkok
 JW Marriott Khao Lak Resort & Spa/Suites
 JW Marriott Phuket Resort & Spa
 
 JW Marriott Marquis Dubai
 
 JW Marriott Anaheim Resort
 JW Marriott Atlanta Buckhead
 JW Marriott Austin
 JW Marriott Charlotte 
 JW Marriott Chicago
 JW Marriott Desert Springs Resort & Spa
 JW Marriott Essex House New York
 JW Marriott Grand Rapids
 JW Marriott Houston by The Galleria
 JW Marriott Houston Downtown
 JW Marriott Indianapolis
 JW Marriott Las Vegas Blvd (under construction, opening 2023)
 JW Marriott Las Vegas Resort & Spa
 JW Marriott Los Angeles L.A. LIVE
 JW Marriott Marco Island Beach Resort
 JW Marriott Marquis Miami
 JW Marriott Miami
 JW Marriott Miami Turnberry Resort & Spa
 JW Marriott Minneapolis Mall of America
 JW Marriott Nashville
 JW Marriott New Orleans
 JW Marriott Orlando Bonnet Creek Resort & Spa
 JW Marriott Orlando, Grande Lakes
 JW Marriott Phoenix Desert Ridge Resort & Spa
 JW Marriott San Antonio Hill Country Resort & Spa
 JW Marriott San Francisco Union Square
 JW Marriott Savannah Plant Riverside District
 JW Marriott Scottsdale Camelback Inn Resort & Spa
 JW Marriott Tampa Water Street
 JW Marriott Tucson Starr Pass Resort & Spa
 JW Marriott Washington, DC
 
JW Marriott Grosvenor House London
 
 JW Marriott Caracas
 
 JW Marriott Hà Nội
 JW Marriott Phú Quốc Emerald Bay Resort & Spa

Gallery

References

External links 

 

 
Marriott International brands